Martha Ruth Stewart Shelley ( Haworth; October 7, 1922 – February 17, 2021), better known as Martha Stewart, was an American actress. She was noted for playing Mildred Atkinson in In a Lonely Place (1950) alongside Humphrey Bogart.

Early life
Stewart was born in Bardwell, Kentucky, on October 7, 1922. Her family relocated to Brooklyn during her childhood. She attended New Utrecht High School, graduating in 1939. She first worked in show business singing on NBC radio with Glenn Miller, Harry James, and Claude Thornhill. She was recruited by a Hollywood talent scout after an appearance at the Stork Club in Manhattan.

Career
Stewart made her film debut in Doll Face (1945), in which she acted alongside Vivian Blaine and sang a duet with Perry Como. She then featured in Johnny Comes Flying Home (1946) opposite Richard Crane, then in I Wonder Who's Kissing Her Now (1947) with June Haver. The following year, she starred with Donald O'Connor in Are You with It?. She also appeared on Broadway in the musical Park Avenue from 1946 to 1947.

Stewart performed one of her best-known roles as murder victim Mildred Atkinson in the classic In a Lonely Place (1950). The film is regarded as one of Humphrey Bogart's finest performances.  That same year, she featured in Convicted with Glenn Ford and Broderick Crawford. She went on to star in Aaron Slick from Punkin Crick (1952) alongside Alan Young and Dinah Shore. She appeared on television as the co-host of Those Two from 1952 to 1953, and in one episode of The Red Skelton Show in 1954. Nearly a decade would elapse before she featured in the episode "A Nice Touch" of The Alfred Hitchcock Hour. Stewart acted for the final time in Surf Party (1964), after which she retired.

Personal life and death
Stewart was married to singer-comedian Joe E. Lewis for two years; the marriage ended in divorce in 1948. Her second marriage was to actor-comedian George O'Hanlon from 1949 to 1952. She married her third and final husband David Shelley in 1955; they remained married until his death in 1982. The couple had three children, one of whom, singer David Shelley, predeceased her in 2015.

Stewart was the subject of an erroneous obituary in 2012, published by the website of Variety magazine, when she was actually still living in California under the name Martha Shelley. Stewart died on February 17, 2021, at the age of 98.

Filmography

Television credits
 The Alfred Hitchcock Hour – "A Nice Touch" (1963)

 The Red Skelton Show – Episode #4.8 (1954)
 Those Two – Co-Host (1952–1953)
 Cavalcade of Stars – Episode #3.16 (1951)

Gallery

References

External links

 
 

1922 births
2021 deaths
Actresses from Kentucky
Actresses from New York City
American film actresses
American musical theatre actresses
American television actresses
People from Bardwell, Kentucky
20th-century American actresses
Place of death missing
21st-century American women